Cheam Lake Wetlands is a regional park located in the Fraser Valley in British Columbia, Canada.

The wetlands are noted for their wildlife, with over 200 species of birds nesting in the park.

References

Wetlands of Canada